Samantha Colas (born 1993) is a Haitian beauty pageant titleholder who won Miss Haiti 2018 on July 6, 2018.

Education 
Colas attended Universite Notre Dame d’Haiti. She is well known as Social Communicator in Haiti.

Pageantry
On July 6, Colas was crowned as Miss Haiti 2018 at the Marriott Hotel. She succeeded outgoing Miss Haiti 2017 Cassandra Chery. As Miss Haiti, Colas will now represent Haiti at Miss Universe 2018 pageant in Bangkok, Thailand.

Personal life 
Colas lives in Port-au-Prince, Haiti.

References

External links
MissHaitiOrg
missuniverse.com

Living people
1993 births
Miss Universe 2018 contestants
Haitian beauty pageant winners
People from Port-au-Prince